Ilaria Debertolis (born 17 September 1989 in Feltre) is an Italian cross-country skier. She competed at the FIS Nordic World Ski Championships 2013 in Val di Fiemme. She competed at the 2014 Winter Olympics in Sochi, in 30 kilometre freestyle, and was part of the Italian team that placed eighth in the relay. She has been in a relationship with fellow cross-country skier Dietmar Nöckler since 2009.

Cross-country skiing results
All results are sourced from the International Ski Federation (FIS).

Olympic Games

World Championships

World Cup

Season standings

References

External links
 

1989 births
Living people
Cross-country skiers at the 2014 Winter Olympics
Cross-country skiers at the 2018 Winter Olympics
Italian female cross-country skiers
Tour de Ski skiers
Olympic cross-country skiers of Italy
Sportspeople from the Province of Belluno